Cilfrew railway station served the village of Cilfrew, in the historical county of Glamorgan, Wales, from 1888 to 1962 on the Neath and Brecon Railway.

History 
The station first appeared in Bradshaw in December 1888, although it appeared in an advert on 20 September 1887. There were only services on Wednesdays and Saturdays when it first opened but a full service was introduced in January 1892. It was also known as Cilfrew Platform in Bradshaw until December 1894. A report claimed that the platform was rotten in 1893 and it drew in a lot of complaints. The Neath and Brecon Railway company apologised, saying that it should have only been open to miners. A new platform was built on 1 May 1895. The station closed on 15 October 1962.

References

External links 

Disused railway stations in Neath Port Talbot
Railway stations in Great Britain opened in 1888
Railway stations in Great Britain closed in 1962
1888 establishments in Wales
1962 disestablishments in Wales